Mr. Smith & The B Flat Band is a London-based ska pop funk band. Led by the soulful tone of English vocalist, Ryan Smith, the group has appeared on T4 for Popworld and played the world-famous main stage at The Cavern Club in Liverpool. With infectious melodies, relatable lyrics, and well-balanced instrumental backings, the band is responsible for catchy tunes such as "Stuff That Makes Me Smile", "Jackie Love", and "Them Two Girls". They credit influences ranging from Marvin Gaye to George Michael for their unique sound.

The group stopped playing together in 2007.  Guitarist and producer Nigel R Glasgow, has since gone on to work with a number of artists and write for adverts and films through his company B Flat Productions.  He is currently touring with UK artist Ghostpoet.

Members
Nigel R Glasgow (Mr. B Flat) - guitar / producer
Ryan Smith (Mr. Smith) - lead vocals
Scarlett Rose -backing vocals
Sam Bremner - drums (now with The Evidents)

External links
 Official Myspace Page
 B Flat Productions

English pop music groups
English funk musical groups
British soul musical groups
English ska musical groups